Alexandru Țiglă (born 19 February 1993) is a Romanian rugby union football player. He plays as a scrum-half for professional SuperLiga club CSM Baia Mare.

Club career
Țiglă started playing rugby at the age of 14 under the guidance of Ciprian Popa from Clubul Sportiv Școlar Bârlad. Soon after he moved to the local amateur club RC Bârlad. After some good performances he moved to Bucharest and joined the ranks of CSM București, this time making his debut in the Romanian SuperLiga. After just one season with the Tigers he was signed by CSM Baia Mare in mid July 2016.

International career
He also plays for Romania's national team, the Oaks, making his international debut at the autumn tests of 2016 in a match against the Los Teros. He is also a proficient rugby union sevens player.

References

External links

1993 births
Living people
Sportspeople from Bârlad
Romanian rugby union players
Romania international rugby union players
CSM București (rugby union) players
CSM Știința Baia Mare players
Rugby union scrum-halves